Jug Sport Hall is an indoor arena in Osijek, Croatia. It is located in city district of Jug I. It has a capacity of 1,250 seats. It was opened in 2005.

Following the example of this hall, in 2007 in Beli Manastir was built hall, which is almost the same to this hall.

See also 

 Beli Manastir Sport Hall

References 

Buildings and structures in Osijek-Baranja County
Indoor arenas in Croatia
Buildings and structures completed in 2005
Sports venues in Osijek